Man in die Donker (Man in the Dark), is a 1962 South African Black and white Neo-noir film directed by Truida Louw Pohl and co-produced by Aletta Gericke, Truida Louw and Renée van der Walt for Trio-Films. This is the first South African film directed by a woman in South African cinema history.

The film stars Babs Laker and Dawid van der Walt in lead role along with Cor Nortjé, Mathilde Hanekom and Elsa Fouché in supportive roles.

Plot
 Babs Laker as Lydia Beyers
 Dawid van der Walt as Dr. Karel Beyers
 Cor Nortjé as Hendrik Luyt
 Mathilde Hanekom as Tant Ellie 
 Elsa Fouché as Helene du Toit
 Esmé Euvrard as Salvation Army speaker
 Douglas Fuchs as Dr. Jacobs
 Frances Holland as Mrs. Maritz
 Willie Steyn as Gerrit Maritz
 Charl Engelbrecht		
 Jaco van der Westhuizen as Jannie Ghitaar
 Heloise van der Merwe		
 Marita Wessels		
 Jan Luyt Pohl as Singer in bar 
 Corrie Myburgh		
 Billy Pretorius		
 Kosie Roux		
 Dirk Engelbrecht		
 Gertie Scharper as Hopscotch girl

References

External links
 
 Die Storie van Klara Viljee on fdb

1962 films
1962 drama films
Neo-noir
South African black-and-white films
South African drama films